The Modern Theatre is located on Washington Street in downtown Boston, Massachusetts. It opened as a movie theater in 1914 in a former commercial building that had been repurposed by noted theater architect Clarence H. Blackall. In 2009 Suffolk University demolished the long-vacant building after removing and storing the facade, and constructed a new building on the site. Suffolk's new Modern Theatre opened on November 4, 2010.

The theater is part of the Washington Street Theatre District, which was placed on the National Register of Historic Places in 1979. The theater was also designated as a Boston Landmark by the Boston Landmarks Commission in 2002.

History

In 1876, Boston architect Levi Newcomb designed a warehouse and showroom for John and James Dobson, owners of the largest carpet mills in the United States. The five-story High Victorian Gothic building was constructed of Ohio sandstone with cast-iron store-fronts on the ground floor. The Dobsons relocated from the Blackstone National Bank building in early 1878.

Boston businessman George White hired Clarence H. Blackall in 1913 to convert the basement and first two floors into a theater for the newly popular photo-plays. The architect's plan for the first floor shows a vestibule with a circular ticket office and a small lobby opening onto a long, narrow auditorium with a balcony, seating about 800 in total. There was a small stage, with an adjoining dressing room, and an orchestra pit, which contained an Estey organ with three manuals and thirty-three ranks of pipes. Acoustic design for the auditorium was done in consultation with Wallace C. Sabine, a professor of physics at Harvard University and a pioneer in architectural acoustics. The interior decoration, described as Florentine Renaissance, used Italian marble, dark mahogany and ersatz tapestry. Blackall also added a neoclassical facade carved from white Vermont marble.

 
The theater was air-conditioned, as reported by the Boston Evening Transcript: 

The Modern Theatre, believed to be the first in Boston designed specifically for movies, was opened on June 25, 1914, by Boston theater entrepreneur Jacob Lourie, with programs of silent films, vocal music performances and organ recitals. In 1927, Lourie installed Vitaphone equipment for a showing of Don Juan. The next year the Modern programmed The Jazz Singer, the first feature-length Vitaphone movie with both music and spoken dialogue.

Renamed the Mayflower Theatre in 1949, by the 1970s it was, like other theaters in the area, showing adult films. The Mayflower closed in 1976 and fell into neglect.

In 1977, David L. Archer, a 28-year-old actor and producer, began to renovate the theater for use as a community performance space. On December 12, 1978, the Modern Theater, operating again under its original name, opened with a 12-day engagement by Sun Ra and The Arkestra. Archer programmed a mix of stage events and music, including performances by notable jazz artists Cecil Taylor and Herbie Mann, the annual Boston Mime Week, and David Mamet’s drama, American Buffalo. However, the venture was short-lived, and the Modern Theater closed in May, 1981, after hosting over 200 events.

After several changes of ownership but with no progress on restoration, Suffolk University purchased the property in 2007, with plans to increase their stock of student housing. In 2009 they demolished the building after carefully removing the facade. CBT Architects of Boston designed a new state-of-the-art theater with a ten-story residence hall above it. The conserved original facade was attached to the new building. Suffolk's new Modern Theatre, a multi-purpose space seating 185, opened on November 4, 2010.

The National Trust for Historic Preservation presented the Modern Theatre at Suffolk University with the 2011 Preservation Honor Award for contributions to the Lower Washington Street Revitalization initiative.

Gallery

Notes and references

Notes

References

External links

  Modern Theatre Study Report Boston Landmarks Commission, June 4, 2002
 The Modern Theatre at cinematreasures.org
 Mayflower Theater, 1971 Photo by Nick DeWolf

Theatres in Boston
Commercial buildings completed in 1876
1914 establishments in Massachusetts
History of Boston
Boston Theater District
Theatres on the National Register of Historic Places in Massachusetts
National Register of Historic Places in Boston